The Suffield Public Schools system is a school district based in Suffield, Connecticut in the United States of America.

It includes A. Ward Spaulding Elementary School, McAlister Intermediate School, Suffield Middle School, and Suffield High School.

It is known for the high school's agricultural science program, which draws students from the surrounding area.

External links
Suffield High School

Suffield Middle School

McAlister Intermediate School

A. Ward Spaulding Elementary School

References

Education in Hartford County, Connecticut
School districts in Connecticut